Fiber-optic communication is a method of transmitting information from one place to another by sending pulses of infrared light through an optical fiber. The light is a form of carrier wave that is modulated to carry information. Fiber is preferred over electrical cabling when high bandwidth, long distance, or immunity to electromagnetic interference is required. This type of communication can transmit voice, video, and telemetry through local area networks or across long distances.

Optical fiber is used by many telecommunications companies to transmit telephone signals, internet communication, and cable television signals. Researchers at Bell Labs have reached a record bandwidth–distance product of over  kilometers per second using fiber-optic communication.

Background 
First developed in the 1970s, fiber-optics have revolutionized the telecommunications industry and have played a major role in the advent of the Information Age. Because of its advantages over electrical transmission, optical fibers have largely replaced copper wire communications in backbone networks in the developed world.

The process of communicating using fiber-optics involves the following basic steps:
 creating the optical signal involving the use of a transmitter, usually from an electrical signal
 relaying the signal along the fiber, ensuring that the signal does not become too distorted or weak
 receiving the optical signal
 converting it into an electrical signal

Applications 
Optical fiber is used by telecommunications companies to transmit telephone signals, Internet communication and cable television signals. It is also used in other industries, including medical, defense, government, industrial and commercial. In addition to serving the purposes of telecommunications, it is used as light guides, for imaging tools, lasers, hydrophones for seismic waves, SONAR, and as sensors to measure pressure and temperature.

Due to lower attenuation and interference, optical fiber has advantages over copper wire in long-distance, high-bandwidth applications. However, infrastructure development within cities is relatively difficult and time-consuming, and fiber-optic systems can be complex and expensive to install and operate. Due to these difficulties, early fiber-optic communication systems were primarily installed in long-distance applications, where they can be used to their full transmission capacity, offsetting the increased cost. The prices of fiber-optic communications have dropped considerably since 2000.

The price for rolling out fiber to homes has currently become more cost-effective than that of rolling out a copper-based network. Prices have dropped to $850 per subscriber in the US and lower in countries like The Netherlands, where digging costs are low and housing density is high.

Since 1990, when optical-amplification systems became commercially available, the telecommunications industry has laid a vast network of intercity and transoceanic fiber communication lines. By 2002, an intercontinental network of 250,000 km of submarine communications cable with a capacity of 2.56 Tb/s was completed, and although specific network capacities are privileged information, telecommunications investment reports indicate that network capacity has increased dramatically since 2004. As of 2020, over 5 billion kilometers of fiber-optic cable has been deployed around the globe.

History 

In 1880 Alexander Graham Bell and his assistant Charles Sumner Tainter created a very early precursor to fiber-optic communications, the Photophone, at Bell's newly established Volta Laboratory in Washington, D.C. Bell considered it his most important invention. The device allowed for the transmission of sound on a beam of light. On June 3, 1880, Bell conducted the world's first wireless telephone transmission between two buildings, some 213 meters apart. Due to its use of an atmospheric transmission medium, the Photophone would not prove practical until advances in laser and optical fiber technologies permitted the secure transport of light. The Photophone's first practical use came in military communication systems many decades later.

In 1954 Harold Hopkins and Narinder Singh Kapany showed that rolled fiber glass allowed light to be transmitted. Jun-ichi Nishizawa, a Japanese scientist at Tohoku University, proposed the use of optical fibers for communications in 1963. Nishizawa invented the PIN diode and the static induction transistor, both of which contributed to the development of optical fiber communications.

In 1966 Charles K. Kao and George Hockham at Standard Telecommunication Laboratories showed that the losses of 1,000 dB/km in existing glass (compared to 5–10 dB/km in coaxial cable) were due to contaminants which could potentially be removed.

Optical fiber with attenuation low enough for communication purposes (about 20 dB/km) was developed in 1970 by Corning Glass Works. At the same time, GaAs semiconductor lasers were developed that were compact and therefore suitable for transmitting light through fiber optic cables for long distances.

In 1973, Optelecom, Inc., co-founded by the inventor of the laser, Gordon Gould, received a contract from ARPA for one of the first optical communication systems. Developed for Army Missile Command in Huntsville, Alabama, the system was intended to allow a short-range missile with video processing to communicate by laser to the ground by means of a five-kilometer long optical fiber that unspooled from the missile as it flew. Optelecom then delivered the first commercial optical communications system to Chevron.

After a period of research starting from 1975, the first commercial fiber-optic telecommunications system was developed which operated at a wavelength around 0.8 μm and used GaAs semiconductor lasers. This first-generation system operated at a bit rate of 45 Mbit/s with repeater spacing of up to 10 km. Soon on 22 April 1977, General Telephone and Electronics sent the first live telephone traffic through fiber optics at a 6 Mbit/s throughput in Long Beach, California.

In October 1973, Corning Glass signed a development contract with CSELT and Pirelli aimed to test fiber optics in an urban environment: in September 1977, the second cable in this test series, named COS-2, was experimentally deployed in two lines (9 km) in Turin, for the first time in a big city, at a speed of 140 Mbit/s.

The second generation of fiber-optic communication was developed for commercial use in the early 1980s, operated at 1.3 μm and used InGaAsP semiconductor lasers. These early systems were initially limited by multi-mode fiber dispersion, and in 1981 the single-mode fiber was revealed to greatly improve system performance, however practical connectors capable of working with single mode fiber proved difficult to develop. Canadian service provider SaskTel had completed construction of what was then the world's longest commercial fiber optic network, which covered  and linked 52 communities.

The first transatlantic telephone cable to use optical fiber was TAT-8, based on Desurvire optimized laser amplification technology. It went into operation in 1988.

Third-generation fiber-optic systems operated at 1.55 μm and had losses of about 0.2 dB/km. This development was spurred by the discovery of indium gallium arsenide and the development of the indium gallium arsenide photodiode by Pearsall. Engineers overcame earlier difficulties with pulse-spreading using conventional InGaAsP semiconductor lasers at that wavelength by using dispersion-shifted fibers designed to have minimal dispersion at 1.55 μm or by limiting the laser spectrum to a single longitudinal mode.

The fourth generation of fiber-optic communication systems used optical amplification to reduce the need for repeaters and wavelength-division multiplexing (WDM) to increase data capacity. The introduction of WDM was the start of optical networking, as WDM became the technology of choice for fiber-optic bandwidth expansion. The first to market with a dense WDM system was Ciena Corp., in June 1996. , Japanese scientists transmitted 319 terabits per second over 3,000 kilometers with four-core fiber cables with standard cable diameter.

The focus of development for the fifth generation of fiber-optic communications is on extending the wavelength range over which a WDM system can operate. The conventional wavelength window, known as the C band, covers the wavelength range 1525–1565 nm, and dry fiber has a low-loss window promising an extension of that range to 1300–1650 nm. Other developments include the concept of optical solitons, pulses that preserve their shape by counteracting the effects of dispersion with the nonlinear effects of the fiber by using pulses of a specific shape.

In the late 1990s through 2000, industry promoters, and research companies such as KMI, and RHK predicted massive increases in demand for communications bandwidth due to increased use of the Internet, and commercialization of various bandwidth-intensive consumer services, such as video on demand. Internet protocol data traffic was increasing exponentially, at a faster rate than integrated circuit complexity had increased under Moore's Law. From the bust of the dot-com bubble through 2006, however, the main trend in the industry has been consolidation of firms and offshoring of manufacturing to reduce costs. Companies such as Verizon and AT&T have taken advantage of fiber-optic communications to deliver a variety of high-throughput data and broadband services to consumers' homes.

Technology 
Modern fiber-optic communication systems generally include optical transmitters that convert electrical signals into optical signals, optical fiber cables to carry the signal, optical amplifiers, and optical receivers to convert the signal back into an electrical signal. The information transmitted is typically digital information generated by computers or telephone systems.

Transmitters 

The most commonly used optical transmitters are semiconductor devices such as light-emitting diodes (LEDs) and laser diodes. The difference between LEDs and laser diodes is that LEDs produce incoherent light, while laser diodes produce coherent light. For use in optical communications, semiconductor optical transmitters must be designed to be compact, efficient and reliable, while operating in an optimal wavelength range and directly modulated at high frequencies.

In its simplest form, an LED emits light through spontaneous emission, a phenomenon referred to as electroluminescence. The emitted light is incoherent with a relatively wide spectral width of 30–60 nm. The large spectrum width of LEDs is subject to higher fiber dispersion, considerably limiting their bit rate-distance product (a common measure of usefulness). LEDs are suitable primarily for local-area-network applications with bit rates of 10–100 Mbit/s and transmission distances of a few kilometers. 

LED light transmission is inefficient, with only about 1% of input power, or about 100 microwatts, eventually converted into launched power coupled into the optical fiber.

LEDs have been developed that use several quantum wells to emit light at different wavelengths over a broad spectrum and are currently in use for local-area wavelength-division multiplexing (WDM) applications.

LEDs have been largely superseded by vertical-cavity surface-emitting laser (VCSEL) devices, which offer improved speed, power and spectral properties, at a similar cost. However, due to their relatively simple design, LEDs are very useful for very low-cost applications. Commonly used classes of semiconductor laser transmitters used in fiber optics include VCSEL, Fabry–Pérot and distributed feedback laser.

A semiconductor laser emits light through stimulated emission rather than spontaneous emission, which results in high output power (~100 mW) as well as other benefits related to the nature of coherent light. The output of a laser is relatively directional, allowing high coupling efficiency (~50%) into single-mode fiber. Common VCSEL devices also couple well to multimode fiber. The narrow spectral width also allows for high bit rates since it reduces the effect of chromatic dispersion. Furthermore, semiconductor lasers can be modulated directly at high frequencies because of short recombination time.

Laser diodes are often directly modulated, that is the light output is controlled by a current applied directly to the device. For very high data rates or very long distance links, a laser source may be operated continuous wave, and the light modulated by an external device, an optical modulator, such as an electro-absorption modulator or Mach–Zehnder interferometer. External modulation increases the achievable link distance by eliminating laser chirp, which broadens the linewidth in directly modulated lasers, increasing the chromatic dispersion in the fiber. For very high bandwidth efficiency, coherent modulation can be used to vary the phase of the light in addition to the amplitude, enabling the use of QPSK, QAM, and OFDM. "Dual-polarization quadrature phase shift keying is a modulation format that effectively sends four times as much information as traditional optical transmissions of the same speed."

Receivers 
The main component of an optical receiver is a photodetector which converts light into electricity using the photoelectric effect. The primary photodetectors for telecommunications are made from Indium gallium arsenide. The photodetector is typically a semiconductor-based photodiode. Several types of photodiodes include p-n photodiodes, p-i-n photodiodes, and avalanche photodiodes. Metal-semiconductor-metal (MSM) photodetectors are also used due to their suitability for circuit integration in regenerators and wavelength-division multiplexers.

Since light may be attenuated and distorted while passing through the fiber, photodetectors are typically coupled with a transimpedance amplifier and a limiting amplifier to produce a digital signal in the electrical domain recovered from the incoming optical signal. Further signal processing such as clock recovery from data performed by a phase-locked loop may also be applied before the data is passed on.

Coherent receivers use a local oscillator laser in combination with a pair of hybrid couplers and four photodetectors per polarization, followed by high speed ADCs and digital signal processing to recover data modulated with QPSK, QAM, or OFDM.

Digital predistortion 
An optical communication system transmitter consists of a digital-to-analog converter (DAC), a driver amplifier and a Mach–Zehnder modulator. The deployment of higher modulation formats (>4-QAM) or higher baud Rates (>) diminishes the system performance due to linear and non-linear transmitter effects. These effects can be categorized as linear distortions due to DAC bandwidth limitation and transmitter I/Q skew as well as non-linear effects caused by gain saturation in the driver amplifier and the Mach–Zehnder modulator. The transmitter digital signal processor performs digital predistortion on the input signals using the inverse transmitter model before sending the samples to the DAC.

Older digital predistortion methods only addressed linear effects. Recent publications also consider non-linear distortions. Berenguer et al models the Mach–Zehnder modulator as an independent Wiener system and the DAC and the driver amplifier are modeled by a truncated, time-invariant Volterra series. Khanna et al use a memory polynomial to model the transmitter components jointly. In both approaches the Volterra series or the memory polynomial coefficients are found using indirect-learning architecture. Duthel et al records, for each branch of the Mach-Zehnder modulator, several signals at different polarity and phases. The signals are used to calculate the optical field. Cross-correlating in-phase and quadrature fields identifies the timing skew. The frequency response and the non-linear effects are determined by the indirect-learning architecture.

Fiber cable types 

An optical fiber cable consists of a core, cladding, and a buffer (a protective outer coating), in which the cladding guides the light along the core by using the method of total internal reflection. The core and the cladding (which has a lower-refractive-index) are usually made of high-quality silica glass, although they can both be made of plastic as well. Connecting two optical fibers is done by fusion splicing or mechanical splicing and requires special skills and interconnection technology due to the microscopic precision required to align the fiber cores.

Two main types of optical fiber used in optic communications include multi-mode optical fibers and single-mode optical fibers. A multi-mode optical fiber has a larger core (≥50 micrometers), allowing less precise, cheaper transmitters and receivers to connect to it as well as cheaper connectors. However, a multi-mode fiber introduces multimode distortion, which often limits the bandwidth and length of the link. Furthermore, because of its higher dopant content, multi-mode fibers are usually expensive and exhibit higher attenuation. The core of a single-mode fiber is smaller (<10 micrometers) and requires more expensive components and interconnection methods, but allows much longer and higher-performance links. Both single- and multi-mode fiber is offered in different grades.

In order to package fiber into a commercially viable product, it typically is protectively coated by using ultraviolet cured acrylate polymers and assembled into a cable. After that, it can be laid in the ground and then run through the walls of a building and deployed aerially in a manner similar to copper cables. These fibers require less maintenance than common twisted pair wires once they are deployed.

Specialized cables are used for long-distance subsea data transmission, e.g. transatlantic communications cable. New (2011–2013) cables operated by commercial enterprises (Emerald Atlantis, Hibernia Atlantic) typically have four strands of fiber and signals cross the Atlantic (NYC-London) in 60–70 ms. The cost of each such cable was about $300M in 2011.

Another common practice is to bundle many fiber optic strands within long-distance power transmission cable using, for instance, an optical ground wire. This exploits power transmission rights of way effectively, ensures a power company can own and control the fiber required to monitor its own devices and lines, is effectively immune to tampering, and simplifies the deployment of smart grid technology.

Amplification 

The transmission distance of a fiber-optic communication system has traditionally been limited by fiber attenuation and by fiber distortion. By using optoelectronic repeaters, these problems have been eliminated. These repeaters convert the signal into an electrical signal and then use a transmitter to send the signal again at a higher intensity than was received, thus counteracting the loss incurred in the previous segment. Because of the high complexity with modern wavelength-division multiplexed signals, including the fact that they had to be installed about once every , the cost of these repeaters is very high.

An alternative approach is to use optical amplifiers which amplify the optical signal directly without having to convert the signal to the electrical domain. One common type of optical amplifier is an erbium-doped fiber amplifier (EDFA). These are made by doping a length of fiber with the rare-earth mineral erbium and laser pumping it with light with a shorter wavelength than the communications signal (typically 980 nm). EDFAs provide gain in the ITU C band at 1550 nm.

Optical amplifiers have several significant advantages over electrical repeaters. First, an optical amplifier can amplify a very wide band at once which can include hundreds of multiplexed channels, eliminating the need to demultiplex signals at each amplifier. Second, optical amplifiers operate independently of the data rate and modulation format, enabling multiple data rates and modulation formats to co-exist and enabling upgrading of the data rate of a system without having to replace all of the repeaters. Third, optical amplifiers are much simpler than a repeater with the same capabilities and are therefore significantly more reliable. Optical amplifiers have largely replaced repeaters in new installations, although electronic repeaters are still widely used when signal conditioning beyond amplification is required.

Wavelength-division multiplexing 

Wavelength-division multiplexing (WDM) is the technique of transmitting multiple channels of information through a single optical fiber by sending multiple light beams of different wavelengths through the fiber, each modulated with a separate information channel. This allows the available capacity of optical fibers to be multiplied. This requires a wavelength division multiplexer in the transmitting equipment and a demultiplexer (essentially a spectrometer) in the receiving equipment. Arrayed waveguide gratings are commonly used for multiplexing and demultiplexing in WDM.

Parameters

Bandwidth–distance product 
Because the effect of dispersion increases with the length of the fiber, a fiber transmission system is often characterized by its bandwidth–distance product, usually expressed in units of MHz·km. This value is a product of bandwidth and distance because there is a trade-off between the bandwidth of the signal and the distance over which it can be carried. For example, a common multi-mode fiber with bandwidth–distance product of 500 MHz·km could carry a 500 MHz signal for 1 km or a 1000 MHz signal for 0.5 km.

Record speeds 
Using wavelength-division multiplexing, each fiber can carry many independent channels, each using a different wavelength of light. The net data rate (data rate without overhead bytes) per fiber is the per-channel data rate reduced by the forward error correction (FEC) overhead, multiplied by the number of channels (usually up to eighty in commercial dense WDM systems ).

Standard fiber cables 
The following summarizes research using standard telecoms-grade single-mode, single-solid-core fiber cables.

Specialized cables 

The following summarizes the current state-of-the-art research using specialized cables that allow spatial multiplexing to occur, use specialized tri-mode fiber cables or similar specialized fiber optic cables.

The 2018 NICT result is notable for breaking the record for throughput using a single core cable, that is, not using spatial multiplexing.
The 2022 TUD result is notable for breaking the record for throughput using a photonic chip.

New techniques 

Research from DTU, Fujikura & NTT is notable in that the team was able to reduce the power consumption of the optics to around 5% compared with more mainstream techniques, which could lead to a new generation of very power-efficient optic components.

Research conducted by the RMIT University, Melbourne, Australia, have developed a nanophotonic device that has achieved a 100 fold increase in current attainable fiber optic speeds by using a twisted-light technique.
This technique carries data on light waves that have been twisted into a spiral form, to increase the optic cable capacity further, this technique is known as orbital angular momentum (OAM). The nanophotonic device uses ultra thin topological nanosheets to measure a fraction of a millimeter of twisted light, the nano-electronic device is embedded within a connector smaller than the size of a USB connector, it fits easily at the end of an optical fiber cable. The device can also be used to receive quantum information sent via twisted light, it is likely to be used in a new range of quantum communication and quantum computing research.

Dispersion 
For modern glass optical fiber, the maximum transmission distance is limited not by direct material absorption but by several types of dispersion, or spreading of optical pulses as they travel along the fiber. Dispersion in optical fibers is caused by a variety of factors. Intermodal dispersion, caused by the different axial speeds of different transverse modes, limits the performance of multi-mode fiber. Because single-mode fiber supports only one transverse mode, intermodal dispersion is eliminated.

In single-mode fiber performance is primarily limited by chromatic dispersion (also called group velocity dispersion), which occurs because the index of the glass varies slightly depending on the wavelength of the light, and light from real optical transmitters necessarily has nonzero spectral width (due to modulation). Polarization mode dispersion, another source of limitation, occurs because although the single-mode fiber can sustain only one transverse mode, it can carry this mode with two different polarizations, and slight imperfections or distortions in a fiber can alter the propagation velocities for the two polarizations. This phenomenon is called fiber birefringence and can be counteracted by polarization-maintaining optical fiber. Dispersion limits the bandwidth of the fiber because the spreading optical pulse limits the rate that pulses can follow one another on the fiber and still be distinguishable at the receiver.

Some dispersion, notably chromatic dispersion, can be removed by a 'dispersion compensator'. This works by using a specially prepared length of fiber that has the opposite dispersion to that induced by the transmission fiber, and this sharpens the pulse so that it can be correctly decoded by the electronics.

Attenuation 
Fiber attenuation, which necessitates the use of amplification systems, is caused by a combination of material absorption, Rayleigh scattering, Mie scattering, and connection losses. Although material absorption for pure silica is only around 0.03 dB/km (modern fiber has attenuation around 0.3 dB/km), impurities in the original optical fibers caused attenuation of about 1000 dB/km. Other forms of attenuation are caused by physical stresses to the fiber, microscopic fluctuations in density, and imperfect splicing techniques.

Transmission windows 

Each effect that contributes to attenuation and dispersion depends on the optical wavelength. There are wavelength bands (or windows) where these effects are weakest, and these are the most favorable for transmission. These windows have been standardized, and the currently defined bands are the following:

Note that this table shows that current technology has managed to bridge the second and third windows that were originally disjoint.

Historically, there was a window used below the O band, called the first window, at 800–900 nm; however, losses are high in this region so this window is used primarily for short-distance communications. The current lower windows (O and E) around 1300 nm have much lower losses. This region has zero dispersion. The middle windows (S and C) around 1500 nm are the most widely used. This region has the lowest attenuation losses and achieves the longest range. It does have some dispersion, so dispersion compensator devices are used to remove this.

Regeneration 
When a communications link must span a larger distance than existing fiber-optic technology is capable of, the signal must be regenerated at intermediate points in the link by optical communications repeaters. Repeaters add substantial cost to a communication system, and so system designers attempt to minimize their use.

Recent advances in fiber and optical communications technology have reduced signal degradation so far that regeneration of the optical signal is only needed over distances of hundreds of kilometers. This has greatly reduced the cost of optical networking, particularly over undersea spans where the cost and reliability of repeaters is one of the key factors determining the performance of the whole cable system. The main advances contributing to these performance improvements are dispersion management, which seeks to balance the effects of dispersion against non-linearity; and solitons, which use nonlinear effects in the fiber to enable dispersion-free propagation over long distances.

Last mile 

Although fiber-optic systems excel in high-bandwidth applications, optical fiber has been slow to achieve its goal of fiber to the premises or to solve the last mile problem. However, FTTH deployment has increased significantly over the last decade and is projected to serve millions more subscribers in the near future. In Japan, for instance EPON has largely replaced DSL as a broadband Internet source. South Korea's KT also provides a service called FTTH (Fiber To The Home), which provides fiber-optic connections to the subscriber's home. The largest FTTH deployments are in Japan, South Korea, and China. Singapore started implementation of their all-fiber Next Generation Nationwide Broadband Network (Next Gen NBN), which is slated for completion in 2012 and is being installed by OpenNet. Since they began rolling out services in September 2010, network coverage in Singapore has reached 85% nationwide.

In the US, Verizon Communications provides a FTTH service called FiOS to select high-ARPU (Average Revenue Per User) markets within its existing territory. The other major surviving ILEC (or Incumbent Local Exchange Carrier), AT&T, uses a FTTN (Fiber To The Node) service called U-verse with twisted-pair to the home. Their MSO competitors employ FTTN with coax using HFC. All of the major access networks use fiber for the bulk of the distance from the service provider's network to the customer.

The globally dominant access network technology is EPON (Ethernet Passive Optical Network). In Europe, and among telcos in the United States, BPON (ATM-based Broadband PON) and GPON (Gigabit PON) had roots in the FSAN (Full Service Access Network) and ITU-T standards organizations under their control.

Comparison with electrical transmission 

The choice between optical fiber and electrical (or copper) transmission for a particular system is made based on a number of trade-offs. Optical fiber is generally chosen for systems requiring higher bandwidth or spanning longer distances than electrical cabling can accommodate.

The main benefits of fiber are its exceptionally low loss (allowing long distances between amplifiers/repeaters), its absence of ground currents and other parasite signal and power issues common to long parallel electric conductor runs (due to its reliance on light rather than electricity for transmission, and the dielectric nature of fiber optic), and its inherently high data-carrying capacity. Thousands of electrical links would be required to replace a single high bandwidth fiber cable. Another benefit of fibers is that even when run alongside each other for long distances, fiber cables experience effectively no crosstalk, in contrast to some types of electrical transmission lines. Fiber can be installed in areas with high electromagnetic interference (EMI), such as alongside utility lines, power lines, and railroad tracks. Nonmetallic all-dielectric cables are also ideal for areas of high lightning-strike incidence.

Single-mode fiber cables are commonly available in  lengths, minimizing the number of splices required over a long cable run. Multi-mode fiber is available in lengths up to 4 km, although industrial standards only mandate 2 km unbroken runs.

In short-distance and relatively low-bandwidth applications, electrical transmission is often preferred because of its
 Lower material cost, where large quantities are not required
 Lower cost of transmitters and receivers
 Capability to carry electrical power as well as signals (in appropriately designed cables)
 Ease of operating transducers in linear mode.

Optical fibers are more difficult and expensive to splice than electrical conductors. And at higher powers, optical fibers are susceptible to fiber fuse, resulting in catastrophic destruction of the fiber core and damage to transmission components.

Because of these benefits of electrical transmission, optical communication is not common in short box-to-box, backplane, or chip-to-chip applications; however, optical systems on those scales have been demonstrated in the laboratory.

In certain situations fiber may be used even for short-distance or low-bandwidth applications, due to other important features:
 Immunity to electromagnetic interference, including nuclear electromagnetic pulses.
 High electrical resistance, making it safe to use near high-voltage equipment or between areas with different earth potentials.
 Lighter weight—important, for example, in aircraft.
 No sparks—important in flammable or explosive gas environments.
 Not electromagnetically radiating, and difficult to tap without disrupting the signal—important in high-security environments.
 Much smaller cable size—important where pathway is limited, such as networking an existing building, where smaller channels can be drilled and space can be saved in existing cable ducts and trays.
 Resistance to corrosion due to non-metallic transmission medium

Optical fiber cables can be installed in buildings with the same equipment that is used to install copper and coaxial cables, with some modifications due to the small size and limited pull tension and bend radius of optical cables. Optical cables can typically be installed in duct systems in spans of 6000 meters or more depending on the duct's condition, layout of the duct system, and installation technique. Longer cables can be coiled at an intermediate point and pulled farther into the duct system as necessary.

Governing standards 
In order for various manufacturers to be able to develop components that function compatibly in fiber optic communication systems, a number of standards have been developed. The International Telecommunication Union publishes several standards related to the characteristics and performance of fibers themselves, including
 ITU-T G.651, "Characteristics of a 50/125 μm multimode graded index optical fibre cable"
 ITU-T G.652, "Characteristics of a single-mode optical fibre cable"

Other standards specify performance criteria for fiber, transmitters, and receivers to be used together in conforming systems. Some of these standards are:
 100 Gigabit Ethernet
 10 Gigabit Ethernet
 Fibre Channel
 Gigabit Ethernet
 HIPPI
 Synchronous Digital Hierarchy
 Synchronous Optical Networking
 Optical transport network (OTN)

TOSLINK is the most common format for digital audio cable using plastic optical fiber to connect digital sources to digital receivers.

See also 
 Dark fiber
 Fiber to the x
 Free-space optical communication

Notes

References 

 Encyclopedia of Laser Physics and Technology
 Fiber-Optic Technologies by Vivek Alwayn

Further reading 
 Keiser, Gerd. (2011). Optical fiber communications, 4th ed. New York, NY: McGraw-Hill, 
 Senior, John. (2008). Optical Fiber Communications: Principles and Practice, 3rd ed. Prentice Hall.

External links

 "Understanding Optical Communications" An IBM redbook
 Fiber Optics - Internet, Cable and Telephone Communication

 
Photonics